Armorican may refer to:
Armorica, an ancient region of northwestern France
Armorican (cattle), a French breed of cattle
Armorican dialect, an extinct dialect of the Gaulish language

See also
 Armorican Massif
 Armorican terrane
 Armorican orogeny, a mountain-building period during the Variscan orogeny
Armoricani, an Iron Age tribe in Brittany
Armorica (disambiguation)

Language and nationality disambiguation pages